Oleclumab (INN; development code MEDI9447) is a human monoclonal antibody targeting the ectonucleotidase CD73 that was designed for the treatment of pancreatic and colorectal and other cancers.

This drug was developed by MedImmune/AstraZeneca.

References 

Monoclonal antibodies
AstraZeneca brands